Virbia fergusoni is a moth in the family Erebidae. It was described by Jennifer M. Zaspel in 2008. It is found in the south-eastern United States, ranging to South Carolina in the north and from Georgia and northern Florida to Alabama in the west. The habitat consists of mixed oak-pine forests.

The length of the forewings is about 11 mm for males and 12 mm for females. The male forewings are umber with dark fuscous on the crossveins of the discal spot forming a small transverse band. The hindwings are peach red, the subterminal region raw umber. The female forewings are cinnamon, sometimes with a salmon costal margin. The hindwings are peach red, the terminal margins fringed with tawny scales. There are probably multiple generations per year with adults recorded on wing from mid-March to mid-July. There is also a single record for September.

Larvae have been reared on plantain species.

Etymology
The species is named in honour of Dr. Douglas Ferguson.

References

Moths described in 2008
fergusoni